Derinöz can refer to:

 Derinöz, Oğuzlar
 Derinöz Dam